Way Too Early with Jonathan Lemire is an American morning news show that airs weekday mornings on MSNBC.

The first incarnation of Way Too Early premiered on July 27, 2009, hosted by Willie Geist. It was later hosted by a variety of NBC News on-air talent, including Thomas Roberts and others on a temporary basis, including Ayman Mohyeldin. The final host was Chief White House Correspondent Chris Jansing. It ended on August 12, 2016, as its lead-in program First Look was expanded back into the full hour and rebranded as Morning Joe First Look to build continuity with the later program. Another apparent reason for the name change was that the 5 a.m. timeslot had become nearly universally programmed as a morning news slot on local television stations in both the Eastern and Central Time Zones, making the title Way Too Early an artifact.

On September 10, 2020, it was announced that Way Too Early would return to the air with Kasie Hunt as the new host, starting on September 21.

On July 16, 2021, Kasie Hunt announced she was delivering her final broadcast and would be joining CNN. On October 25, 2021, MSNBC announced that Jonathan Lemire would be the new host of the show.

History
Phil Griffin, President of MSNBC, announced the show on July 15, 2009, and described it as a "pre-game show" for Morning Joe. Mike Barnicle often filled in for original host Willie Geist, jokingly referring to the show as "Way Too Old (or Elderly) with Mike Barnicle", while Peter Alexander also covered for Geist. On September 24, 2012, NBC News announced that Geist would be named co-host of the 9 a.m. hour of Today, filling the co-host slot formerly held by Savannah Guthrie (who now anchors the 7-9 a.m. portion of the morning program).

The original executive producer was Chris Licht, who was also the co-creator and executive producer of Morning Joe before leaving MSNBC to become executive producer of CBS This Morning and Vice President of Programming at CBS.

Way Too Early was not branded "Brewed by Starbucks" like Morning Joe until the sponsorship deal expired in September 2013. Both shows had similar graphics packages, are broadcast from the same set, and frequently reference each other.

On May 8, 2013, MSNBC announced that CNBC reporter Brian Shactman would be the new regular host of Way Too Early. He began his anchoring duties for the show May 13, 2013.

On January 3, 2014, MSNBC announced that Thomas Roberts would be the new regular host of Way Too Early starting on January 13. Roberts left in mid 2015 to do various daytime anchor duties, with no guest host announced.

Way Too Early aired its final regular edition on July 22, 2016, from July 25 to August 12, 2016, Way Too Early expanded to 1 hour, taking over First Look briefly. The next Monday, Way Too Early became Morning Joe First Look, with a few former Way Too Early segments blended into the second half-hour.

On September 10, 2020, MSNBC announced it would relaunch Way Too Early, with Kasie Hunt as the new host, effectively replacing Morning Joe First Look, starting on September 21.

On July 16, 2021, Kasie Hunt announced she was delivering her final broadcast.

Way Too Early had no permanent host until October 25, 2021, when MSNBC and Morning Joe co-hosts Joe Scarborough and Mika Brzezinski announced that Jonathan Lemire will be the new host of the show.

Segments
Regular segments on Way Too Early have included:
Three Questions – Beginning the show with three video clips of newsworthy events from the previous day, and posing an open-ended question relating to them.
The News – A fast-paced round-up of the previous day's and overnight news.
All Up In Your Business – Business and market-related news, with analysis from the CNBC London bureau.
The Weather – National forecast from The Weather Channel, currently provided by NBC meteorologist Bill Karins.
Sports – Highlights of the top sports stories.
Morning Buzz – A "wake-up call" phone segment to a prominent figure, celebrity, correspondent, or politician to discuss a news topic.
Sound Smart – Random fact or some other piece of information to help you "sound smart" during the day.
The Cooler – Soft news stories and other conversation starters.
Louis Burgdorf from the Control Room – Near the end of the program, Burgdorf rounds up feature, offbeat and entertainment headlines from the program's Rockefeller Center control room.
Why Are You Up? - Viewers are asked to write in with their personal reasons for being up so early.

Hosts
Willie Geist – (2009–2012)
Brian Shactman – (2013–2014)
Thomas Roberts – (2014–2015)
Amy Holmes – (2015–2016)
Chris Jansing – (2016)
Frances Rivera – (2016)
Kasie Hunt – (2020–2021)
Jonathan Lemire - (2021–present)

Substitute hosts
Substitute hosts for the show have included Luke Russert, Savannah Guthrie, Peter Alexander, Mike Barnicle, Jonathan Capehart, Jonathan Lemire, Alicia Menendez,  Alex Witt, Sam Stein and Mark Halperin, with Bill Karins and Louis Burgdorf having hosted the entire program.

References

External links
 

MSNBC original programming
2000s American television news shows
2010s American television news shows
2020s American television news shows
2009 American television series debuts
2016 American television series endings
2020 American television series debuts
American television spin-offs
English-language television shows
American television series revived after cancellation